Frank C. Mazzuca (July 11, 1905 – January 14, 1969) was an American politician.

From Kansas City, Missouri, Mazzuca served in the Missouri House of Representatives from 1965 until his death in 1969 and was a Democrat. Mazzuca died suddenly of a heart attack in Jefferson City, Missouri while attending the Missouri 1969 Inaugural Ceremony.

Notes

1905 births
1969 deaths
Politicians from Kansas City, Missouri
Democratic Party members of the Missouri House of Representatives
20th-century American politicians